Umirzak Shukeyev (Өмірзақ Естайұлы Шөкеев)  (born 12 March 1964) is a Kazakh politician who's serving as the akim of Turkistan Region since 2019. Prior to that, he served as the Minister of Agriculture from 2017 to 2019, chairman of Samruk-Kazyna, Kazakhstan's sovereign wealth fund from 2011 to 2017, First Deputy Prime Minister from 2009 to 2011, and prior to that, Deputy Prime Minister from 2007, akim of South Kazakhstan from 2006 to 2007, akim of Astana from 2004 to 2006, akim of Kostanay Region from 1998 to 2004, Minister of Economy and Trade from 1995 to 1997 while serving as Deputy Prime Minister.

Biography

Early life and career 
Shukeyev was born in Turkistan. He graduated from the Moscow Economics and Statistics Institute in 1986, after having studied economics and mathematics. After graduating, he was employed as junior and leading research fellow in a number of research facilities in Almaty.

From 1992, Shukeyev on to work as a consultant with the Supreme Economic Council under the President; as an advisor to the President for economic issues; vice head of the Finance, Labor and Social Protection of the Population Department in the Presidential Service and in the Cabinet.

In 1993, he became the deputy head of Administration of South Kazakhstan Region.

Political career 
In November 1995, Shukeyev was appointed as the Minister of Economy. While serving from the position, he became the Deputy Prime Minister of Kazakhstan in July 1997 until dissolution of the government in October 1997. From February to November 1997, Shukeyev was a member of the Supreme Economic Council under the President and then a member National Council for Sustainable Development of Kazakhstan from November 1997 to August 1998. In March 1997, Shukeyev became a chairman of the Supervisory Board of Kazakhoil CJSC and served that position until December 1997. In April 1998, Shukeyev became the deputy head of the Presidential Administration of Kazakhstan.

On 19 August 1998, Shukeyev was appointed as the akim of Kostanay Region. Later he served as the akim of Astana from 20 March 2004 until being appointed as the akim of South Kazakhstan Region on 20 September 2006.

On 27 August 2007, Shukeyev was appointed as the Deputy Prime Minister of Kazakhstan under Massimov's cabinet until he was became the First Deputy Prime Minister from 3 March 2009, making him the first person to hold such post since 2004. He was dismissed from duties on 26 December 2011 and the following day on 27 December, Shukeyev became the chairman and the member of the Board of Directors of the JSC Samruk-Kazyna.

On 15 December 2017, Shukeyev became the Minister of Agriculture. After the government was dismissed on 21 February 2019, he was shortly appointed as the akim of Turkistan Region on 25 February 2019 – 26 August 2022.

Awards 
 Awarded the Order of Parasat.

References

Living people
1964 births
Dughlats
Government ministers of Kazakhstan
Mayors of Astana
Recipients of the Order of Parasat
Ministers of Economy (Kazakhstan)
Ministers of Agriculture (Kazakhstan)
People from Turkistan Region
Moscow State University of Economics, Statistics, and Informatics alumni
Deputy Prime Ministers of Kazakhstan
First Deputy Prime Ministers of Kazakhstan